The 1973 Virginia Slims of Houston was a women's tennis tournament played on indoor carpet courts at the Net-Set (West Side) Racquet Club in Houston, Texas in the United States that was part of the 1973 Virginia Slims World Championship Series. It was the third edition of the tournament and was held from September 17 through September 24, 1973. Unseeded Françoise Dürr won the singles title and earned $7,000 first-prize money. The final was delayed by one day due to rain. 

Just before the start of the tournament three of the four top-seeded players (Margaret Court, Evonne Goolagong and Chris Evert) pulled out and Billie Jean King became the new top-seeded player. King also played the "Battle of the Sexes" match against Bobby Riggs during the week of the tournament.

Finals

Singles
 Françoise Dürr defeated  Rosemary Casals 6–4, 1–6, 6–4

Doubles
 Mona Schallau /  Pam Teeguarden defeated  Françoise Dürr /  Betty Stöve 6–3, 5–7, 6–4

Prize money

Notes

References

Virginia Slims of Houston
Virginia Slims of Houston
Virginia Slims of Houstonl
Virginia Slims of Houston
Virginia Slims of Houston
Virginia Slims of Houston